Lacta is a Brazilian chocolate and confectionery maker, founded in São Paulo in 1912 as Société Anonyme des Chocolats Suisses. In 1996, Lacta was purchased by Kraft Foods.

Lacta is currently owned and distributed in Brazil by Mondelez International.

References

External links
 Official site (in Portuguese)

Brazilian chocolate companies
Defunct companies of Brazil
Food and drink companies established in 1912
Mondelez International
1912 establishments in Brazil
Manufacturing companies based in São Paulo
Chocolate bars
Brazilian brands